Conferencing may refer to:

Web conferencing, a service that allows conferencing events to be shared with remote locations
Videoconferencing,  the conduct of a videoconference by a set of telecommunication technologies
Teleconference, held by one or more computers
Synchronous conferencing, the technologies informally known as online chat
Data conferencing, a communication session among two or more participants sharing computer data in real time
Conference call, a type of telephone call

See also 
Conference